Michael Edward Yarwood,  (born 14 June 1941) is an English impressionist, comedian , and actor. He was one of Britain's top-rated entertainers, regularly appearing on television from the 1960s to the 1980s.

Early life
Michael Edward Yarwood was born on Saturday, 14 June 1941 in Bredbury, Cheshire. After leaving Secondary Modern School, he worked as a messenger and then salesman at a garment warehouse. He played football as a child but did not pursue a professional career. Later he was a director of the Stockport County football club.

Career

London Palladium
Yarwood appeared on British television shows in the 1960s and 1970s. Before his various eponymous BBC Television series, he worked for the ITV franchise holder ATV, and for Thames Television after he left the BBC. Yarwood owed his initial success to the Sunday Night at the London Palladium variety "spectacular", on which he first appeared in 1964. His appearance coincided with the senior political career of Labour Party leader and Prime Minister, Harold Wilson, whom Yarwood impersonated.

Topping the TV ratings
At their height, Yarwood's BBC TV shows regularly attracted 18 million viewers. The shows included a varied mix of comic sketches, guest musicians, and a closing song sung by Yarwood (introduced by the line, "and this is me", which became the title of his first autobiography).

Among the prominent personalities he portrayed were:

 Eddie Waring – rugby league commentator
 Brian Clough – football manager
 Robin Day – political interviewer on the BBC
 Magnus Pyke – TV science presenter
 Alf Garnett – Warren Mitchell's character from Till Death Us Do Part
 Columbo – Peter Falk's American detective in the series of the same name
 Frank Spencer – the comic creation of sitcom actor Michael Crawford
 Ted Heath – Wilson's Conservative Party rival

Using colour-separation overlay and video editing, Yarwood frequently stages set pieces in which he appeared as several characters at the same time using pre-recorded segments.

Yarwood's performance as Harold Wilson became his trademark. He briefly caused some controversy by including Prince Charles as one of his regular impressions.

The Mike Yarwood Christmas Show in 1977 was watched by 21.4 million people and is the highest-rated British television program of that year. The show remains one of the most-watched television programses (excluding news and sport) in British history.

Yarwood was the subject of a This Is Your Life special, presented by Eamonn Andrews on 31 May 1978. A behind-the-scenes documentary called Mike Yarwood: This is His Life was made six years later, also featuring Andrews, alongside contributions from Bruce Forsyth, David Frost and Harold Wilson.

Characters' catchphrases
Yarwood's characterisations also created catchphrases that came to be identified with famous figures, even if they never actually used them. However, the two most famous were spoken by the people he caricatured. "Silly Billy", spoken by his caricature of Chancellor of the Exchequer Denis Healey, was used by Healey to describe strikers. It was rumoured that "I mean that most sincerely, folks", spoken by Yarwood's caricature of Opportunity Knocks presenter Hughie Green, was made up by Yarwood, however, it was first spoken by Green.

Part of the Cotton Crew in the BBC
Yarwood's career peaked during the 1970s when he was one of a stable of stars under the BBC Light Entertainment impresario Bill Cotton, alongside Bruce Forsyth, Dick Emery, Morecambe and Wise, Val Doonican and the Two Ronnies, all these performers have started their careers on ITV during the preceding decade. By the late 1970s, some of them left the BBC and returned to independent television.

Both Yarwood and Morecambe and Wise signed up with Thames TV, Morecambe, and Wise went to Thames in 1978 with Yarwood signed by Thames in 1982, with mixed results; Morecambe and Wise fared better than Yarwood and their ratings remained relatively high. Forsyth signed to LWT and suffered a terrible start when his Big Night series was canceled. However, unlike Yarwood, Forsyth bounced back and enjoyed success with Play Your Cards Right.

Late career
Yarwood's Thames TV show was canceled at the end of 1987, and he concentrated on stage work. Subsequent attempts to resurrect his television career failed, although he did make an appearance on the satirical show Have I Got News for You in November 1995.

In the mid-1990s, Yarwood had the chance to return to the stage as prime minister John Major, but failed to re-establish himself before Major's premiership ended. He claimed that one of the difficulties in impersonating John Major and Tony Blair was that they were "nice guys".

In 2003, Yarwood made a public appearance at the Albany Comedy Club in London, at the invitation of Bob Monkhouse. It was Monkhouse's last show.

In 2021, Yarwood's Christmas shows were licensed from Fremantle/Thames by That's TV who wanted to broadcast the shows as part of its festive offering, alongside other programs such as The Kenny Everett Show, Benny Hill, and Beadle's About, all of which have not been seen in full on a British television channel in more than 20 years.

Personal life
He was married to the dancer Sandra Burville from 1969–1985.  They had two children.

In October 1999, Yarwood underwent treatment for depression at the Priory Clinic in Roehampton, London.

From 2007, Yarwood lived alone in Weybridge, Surrey.

In 2021 it was reported that he was a resident of Brinsworth House, the residential and nursing retirement home in Twickenham, west London, for theatre and entertainment professionals.

Filmography
 Three of a Kind (BBC) (1967)
 Will the Real Mike Yarwood Stand Up? (ATV) (1968–1969)
 Look: Mike Yarwood (BBC) (1971–1976)
 Mike Yarwood in Persons (BBC) (1976–1981)
 The Mike Yarwood Show (Thames) (1982–1987)  
 Yarwood's in Town (Thames) (1982) Live on-stage show

Bibliography
 And This is Me (1974)
 Mike Yarwood's Confession Album (1978)
 Impressions of My Life (1986)

References

External links

Mike Yarwood in pantomime at the Coventry Theatre, Coventry, 1968–69
Mike Yarwood review mentioning British television comedy in the 1970s, in The Guardian

1941 births
Living people
20th-century English comedians
21st-century English comedians
British male comedy actors
English impressionists (entertainers)
English male comedians
Officers of the Order of the British Empire
People from Bredbury
People from Weybridge